Endotricha sandaraca is a species of snout moth in the genus Endotricha. It was described by Paul E. S. Whalley in 1963, and is known from Borneo.

References

Moths described in 1963
Endotrichini